Dutton v Poole (1678) is a landmark decision in the Court of Chancery.

It established the rule that privity of contract coupled with lack of consideration preclude third-party suit for breach of a contract and an exception to the rule in appropriate close family relationships. The exception it stated was, having been shunned in run-of-the-mill contract cases for around a century, in 1999 reinstatated and broadened by the Contracts (Rights of Third Parties) Act 1999.

Facts
In this case a son contracted with his father not to fell and sell the timber from their oak wood which the son would then inherit, and in exchange, he would pay £1000 to his sister on her marriage. The sister married after the father's death, and the son refused to make good the promised sum.

Decision of court of law and of the court of equity
In this case Scroggs C.J. with strong reasons permitted the sister to appeal from the decision of a more junior judge of his court despite the legal prohibition caused by her not being a party to the contract (privity of contract), on the basis that she was a close family member. Scroggs held that "apparent consideration of love and affection from the father to his children [means] the consideration and promise to the father may well extend to the children."

An appeal by the son to the Court of Chancery (i.e. in the then sometimes conflicting domain of the law, the courts of equity) reinforced the determination for his sister.  The decision was confirmed in Martyn v Hind and cited in Drive Yourself Hire Co v Strutt.

Exception to privity of contract
This exception was for almost a century from 1884 considered not part of the common law, and was directly refuted in Tweddle v Atkinson (1861).

The legal and equitable narrow exemptions of Dutton v Poole (to the same effect) were in 1967 in a very limited way re-endorsed.  The Judicial Committee of the House of Lords case Beswick v Beswick confirmed their application to Executor-claimants seeking equity's assistance to enforce promises to pay them indirectly contained in contracts between third parties and the deceased. The leading judges expressed a great deal of regret in the statutory law not having loosened the doctrine still further (which took place 32 years later in 1999).

See also

English contract law
Tweddle v Atkinson (1861) 1 B&S 393, the traditional rule of privity
Dunlop Pneumatic Tyre Co Ltd v Selfridge & Co Ltd [1915] AC 847, affirming the privity rule 250 years later in a resale price maintenance case.
Sprat v Agar
The Physicians case

References

Lord Denning cases
English privity case law
English remedy case law
House of Lords cases